The Recopa Sudamericana is an annual association football competition organized by CONMEBOL. It is contested between the winners of the Copa Libertadores and the Copa Sudamericana. The Recopa Sudamericana was contested between the winners of the Copa Libertadores, and the Supercopa Sudamericana, from 1989 until 1998, when CONMEBOL discontinued the Supercopa Sudamericana. The last Recopa Sudamericana in this format was the 1998 edition between Cruzeiro and River Plate which was won by the former.

The format of the competition has varied greatly; it has been played over two legs, one at each participating club's stadium, or at a single neutral venue. Since the 2005 competition, the final has been contested in a home-and-away format. The 1998 competition was played as part of the Copa Mercosur. The 1993 tournament was played as part of the Campeonato Brasileiro Série A. The 1991 edition was not played at all since Paraguay's Olimpia won both the Libertadores and Supercopa. Although Brazilian team São Paulo also won the two qualifying competitions, they disputed the 1994 edition against Copa CONMEBOL winner Botafogo.

Like all CONMEBOL tournaments, the teams accumulate points according to the results of the match (3 for a win, 1 for a draw, 0 for a loss). The team with the most points after both legs wins the Recopa. The current Recopa is contested over a two-legged tie; the first leg is held at the stadium of the Copa Sudamericana champion, and the second leg is played at the Copa Libertadores champion's venue. Ties in points are settled initially on goal difference, then by away goals. If the teams are tied after full-time, a penalty shootout will decide the winner of the finals.

Argentine club Boca Juniors hold the record for the most victories, winning the competition four times. Boca Juniors, São Paulo, and Ecuador's LDU Quito are the only teams to have defended the title successfully. Brazilian clubs are the most successful in the tournament, having amassed seven titles. The current champion is Palmeiras, who beat Athletico Paranaense to win the 2022 Recopa Sudamericana.

Matches

Performances

By club

By country

By method of qualification

See also
List of Recopa Sudamericana winning managers

Notes

References

External links
 Recopa Sudamericana on RSSSF

Lists of association football matches